Pepephone is a Spanish mobile virtual network operator (MVNO), operated by Pepemobile. It was launched in March 2007, using the Vodafone Spain network. In February 2015, Pepephone migrated to the Movistar network.

See also 
 Mobile virtual network operator

References

External links 
 

Companies based in the Community of Madrid
Spanish companies established in 2007
Mobile phone companies of Spain
Mobile virtual network operators